Dettori is an Italian surname. Notable people with the surname include:

Alessandro Dettori, association football player
Bruno Dettori, politician
Francesco Dettori, association football player
Frankie Dettori, horse racing jockey
Gianfranco Dettori, retired horse racing jockey, father of Frankie (Lanfranco) above
Giancarlo Dettori, actor

Italian-language surnames